The 2001 UCLA Bruins football team represented the University of California, Los Angeles in the 2001 NCAA Division I-A football season.  They played their home games at the Rose Bowl in Pasadena, California and were led by head coach Bob Toledo. Despite a winning record, the Bruins decided not to participate in a bowl game, fearing that the program would lose several hundred thousand dollars to play in a lower-tiered bowl.

Schedule

Game summaries

Alabama

Roster

References

UCLA
UCLA Bruins football seasons
UCLA Bruins football